Bolo (Amharic "valley, trench") is a town in central Ethiopia.

Overview
The market in Bolo was important for coffee in the 19th century. In 1961–62, the market was held on Tuesdays.

Based on figures from the Central Statistical Agency (Ethiopia), Bolo has an estimated total population of 1,157 of whom 579 are men and 578 women. The 1994 national census reported this town had a total population of 647 of whom 314 were men and 333 were women.

Notes

Populated places in the Amhara Region